Hemilienardia calcicincta is a species of sea snail, a marine gastropod mollusk in the family Raphitomidae.

Description
The length of the shell attains 4 mm, its diameter 2.25 mm.

(Original description) The small shell is incrassate and rugose. It contains six whorls. It is a little bright white semi-opaque. This opacity being caused by a dead-white transverse band crossing the few, coarse, prominent ribs and becoming broader in the body whorl. The aperture is narrow. The outer lip, under a lens, is very beautiful, being minutely warted, and with four denticles, the columellar margin with four plaits.

Distribution
This marine species is endemic to Australia and occurs from the Gulf of Carpentaria to Queensland

References

 Wiedrick S.G. (2017). Aberrant geomorphological affinities in four conoidean gastropod genera, Clathurella Carpenter, 1857 (Clathurellidae), Lienardia Jousseaume, 1884 (Clathurellidae), Etrema Hedley, 1918 (Clathurellidae) and Hemilienardia Boettger, 1895 (Raphitomidae), with the descriptionof fourteen new Hemilienardia species from the Indo-Pacific. The Festivus. special issue: 2-45.

External links
  Hedley, C. 1922. A revision of the Australian Turridae. Records of the Australian Museum 13(6): 213-359, pls 42-56 
 

calcicincta
Gastropods described in 1895
Gastropods of Australia